In topology and related areas of mathematics, the quotient space of a topological space under a given equivalence relation is a new topological space constructed by endowing the quotient set of the original topological space with the quotient topology, that is, with the finest topology that makes continuous the canonical projection map (the function that maps points to their equivalence classes). In other words, a subset of a quotient space is open if and only if its preimage under the canonical projection map is open in the original topological space.

For example, identifying the points of a sphere that belong to the same diameter produces the projective plane as a quotient space.

Definition

 
For any subset  (so in particular,  for every ) the following holds:
 

The quotient space under  is the quotient set  equipped with the quotient topology, which is the topology whose open sets are the subsets  such that  is an open subset of  that is,  is open in the quotient topology on  if and only if  
Thus, 
 
Equivalently, the open sets of the quotient topology are the subsets of  that have an open preimage under the canonical map  (which is defined by ). 
Similarly, a subset  is closed in  if and only if  is a closed subset of 

The quotient topology is the final topology on the quotient set, with respect to the map

Quotient map

A map  is a quotient map (sometimes called an identification map) if it is surjective, and a subset  is open if and only if  is open. 
Equivalently, a surjection  is a quotient map if and only if for every subset   is closed in  if and only if  is closed in   

Final topology definition

Saturated sets and quotient maps

In particular, open subsets of  that are  saturated have no impact on whether or not the function  is a quotient map; non-saturated subsets are irrelevant to the definition of "quotient map" just as they are irrelevant to the open-set definition of continuity (because a function  is continuous if and only if for every  subset  of   being open in  implies  is open in ). 

Every quotient map is continuous but not every continuous map is a quotient map.

Quotient space of fibers characterization

It is a surjective map and for all   if and only if  consequently,  for all  In particular, this shows that the set of equivalence class  is exactly the set of fibers of the canonical map 
If  is a topological space then giving  the quotient topology induced by  will make it into a quotient space and make  into a quotient map. 
Up to a homeomorphism, this construction is representative of all quotient spaces; the precise meaning of this is now explained. 

These maps are related by:  
From this and the fact that  is a quotient map, it follows that  is continuous if and only if this is true of  Furthermore,  is a quotient map if and only if  is a homeomorphism (or equivalently, if and only if both  and its inverse are continuous).

Related definitions

A  is a surjective map  with the property that for every subset  the restriction  is also a quotient map. 
There exist quotient maps that are not hereditarily quotient.

Examples

 Gluing. Topologists talk of gluing points together.
 Consider the unit square  and the equivalence relation ~ generated by the requirement that all boundary points be equivalent, thus identifying all boundary points to a single equivalence class. Then  is homeomorphic to the sphere 

Adjunction space. The resulting quotient space is denoted  The 2-sphere is then homeomorphic to a closed disc with its boundary identified to a single point: 
 Consider the set  of real numbers with the ordinary topology, and write  if and only if  is an integer.
The orbit space  is homeomorphic to 
Note: The notation  is somewhat ambiguous. If  is understood to be a group acting on  via addition, then the quotient is the circle.
This counterexample can be generalized to nets by letting  be any directed set, and making  into a net by declaring that for any   holds if and only if both (1)  and (2) if  then the -indexed net defined by letting  equal  and equal to  has no lift (by ) to a convergent -indexed net in

Properties

The quotient space  together with the quotient map  is characterized by the following universal property: if  is a continuous map such that  implies  for all  then there exists a unique continuous map  such that  In other words, the following diagram commutes:

One says that  descends to the quotient for expressing this, that is that it factorizes through the quotient space. This criterion is copiously used when studying quotient spaces.

Given a continuous surjection  it is useful to have criteria by which one can determine if  is a quotient map. Two sufficient criteria are that  be open or closed. Note that these conditions are only sufficient, not necessary. It is easy to construct examples of quotient maps that are neither open nor closed. For topological groups, the quotient map is open.

Compatibility with other topological notions

Separation

 In general, quotient spaces are ill-behaved with respect to separation axioms.
 If the quotient map is open, then  is a Hausdorff space if and only if ~ is a closed subset of the product space 

Connectedness

 If a space is connected or path connected, then so are all its quotient spaces.
 A quotient space of a simply connected or contractible space need not share those properties.

Compactness

 If a space is compact, then so are all its quotient spaces.
 A quotient space of a locally compact space need not be locally compact.

Dimension

 The topological dimension of a quotient space can be more (as well as less) than the dimension of the original space; space-filling curves provide such examples.

See also

Topology

 
 
 
 
 
 
 

Algebra

Notes

References

  
  
  
  
  
  
  
  
 

Theory of continuous functions
General topology
Group actions (mathematics)
Space (topology)
Topology